El Chico National Park is a protected area in the State of Hidalgo, Mexico. It is one of the oldest protected areas in Mexico, as its foundation dates to 1898 when the then president of the republic, General Porfirio Díaz, by decree, created "Monte Vedado del Mineral del Chico". Since this date, the ancient conifer forests have been protected from the deforestation suffered in other parts of the country. Another decree followed in 1915 and still another by Presidential Agreement on 13 September 1922, which declared Monte Vedado to be cataloged as a forest reservation.

The park has an extensive and varied ecosystem typical of the region. It contains large forests of conifers, several species of animals.

Decree 
El Chico National Park was created by means of an official decree issued on 6 July 1982.

Orography 

The highland zone is in the Pachuca Mountain range. It is of volcanic origin and its limits split it north of the Valley of Mexico. This range is a southwestern extension of the Sierra Madre Oriental where it meets the Trans-Mexican Volcanic Belt.
The majority of these elevations feature rocky crags of volcanic origin that they are eroded by climate.

Hydrography 

In this highland zone, there are several springs which form rivers and tributaries, crossing the greater part of the park. There are waterfalls associated with Río el Milagro. The hydrological basin is that of the Pánuco River.  Sportive fishing occurs at El Cedral.

Flora and fauna 
This forest presents one of the best ecosystems preserved in the zone that corresponds to the splits between the North and the Valley of Mexico. Vegetation is diverse, housing some endemic species and others that are not very abundant or predominate in the country, in particular the Cupressus which is not very common in the Mexican forests.

The following species of trees are present in the park: Pinus teocote and Pinus rudis; Abies (fir), particularly Abies religiosa; Quercus (oak), particularly Quercus laurina, Quercus affinis, Quercus rugosa, and Quercus mexicana. Of Cupressus, Cupressus lusitanica and Cupressus benthamii are featured.  The juniper Juniperus monticola forms thickets.

A total of 17 species have been categorized for special protection under the agreement NOM-59-SEMARNAT-2001).

Recreation 
A visitor center and park office provide tourist information, a cafeteria, audiovisual area, and exhibition area. There is also a tower for detection and surveillance against forest fires. There is also the Alpine Hostel “Miguel Hidalgo”, a trailer park , the Oriel “Crag of the Raven”, and two low impact, ecotourist camp sites.

Notas

External links 
 Planeta.com: description of El Chico National Park
 Government publication: El Chico National Park

National parks of Mexico
Protected areas of Hidalgo (state)
Pánuco River
Protected areas of the Sierra Madre Oriental
1982 establishments in Mexico
Protected areas established in 1982
Natural history of Hidalgo (state)
Tourist attractions in Hidalgo (state)